The orange-spotted bulbul (Pycnonotus bimaculatus) is a species of songbird in the bulbul family of passerine birds. It is endemic to Java, Bali and Sumatra.

It favors forest edges and open meadows in montane forests.

Taxonomy and systematics
The orange-spotted bulbul was originally described in the genus Turdus by Thomas Horsfield in 1821. Until 2016, the Aceh bulbul (Pycnonotus snouckaerti) was considered as a subspecies of the orange-spotted bulbul until split by the IOC. Most other authorities have not yet recognized this split.

Subspecies
Two subspecies are recognized:
 P. b. bimaculatus – (Horsfield, 1821): Found on south-western Sumatra, western and central Java
 P. b. tenggerensis – (van Oort, 1911): Found on eastern Java and Bali

Description 
Up to 20 cm long. It is a dark-colored and active bulbul with a rounded tail.

Calls 
It is a noisy bird, giving out a variety of harsh and loud calls and songs.

Behaviour and ecology

Diet 
It is a frugivore.

Reproduction 
It breeds throughout the year. Nesting occurs year-round, peaking in May. Nests are robust and cup-shaped.

References 

orange-spotted bulbul
Endemic fauna of Indonesia
Birds of Sumatra
Birds of Java
Birds of Bali
orange-spotted bulbul
Taxa named by Thomas Horsfield
Taxonomy articles created by Polbot